is a 12-part anime OVA loosely based on Yoshiki Takaya's manga, Bio Booster Armor Guyver. It was released in Japan from 1989 to 1992. It is the second animated adaptation, following the 1986 OVA Guyver: Out of Control.

Plot
Divided into two series, this OVA series tells a condensed version of the first five volumes.

Differences between manga and OVA
Though the series follows the manga much more closely than the original OVA, Guyver: Out of Control, there are still some significant differences between the manga and this OVA series. The main characters were included and the general feeling of manga plot are still there. The series of events that happen are where the major differences occur, as well as character appearances. An example was the appearance of Vamore; in the OVA he appeared immediately after Guyver I had defeated Gregole, in contrast to the manga where he appeared during the first kidnapping of Tetsuro. The Hyper Zoanoid Team 5 were also introduced much earlier than in the manga. In fact, an entire sequence of the team attacking Sho's school was added in as well as a battle between the two Guyvers and the team in the Chronos headquarters.

US Release

The OVA series was first released in the United States by U.S. Renditions in 1992. L.A. Hero, which released the first OVA, Guyver: Out of Control, provided the translation. It was released on 6 VHS tapes dubbed in English. All tapes had two episodes per tape with the first part of the series on the first three tapes and the second part on the last three tapes.

After U.S. Renditions rights expired, the series was later picked up by Manga Entertainment and released one episode per VHS. They later condensed the series onto two DVDs with each series on a separate DVD. The DVDs featured both English and Japanese audio tracks.

Although much of the original audio tracks for the English dubbing were kept from the U.S. Rendition version, there were some minor edits to the videos. The opening intro was slightly edited and gray boxes with English credits were placed over the original credits that were in Japanese, though unedited introductions were included in the special features.
Some of the voices were re-dubbed.  The final episode was also edited, mainly the nudity was removed. However, an unedited version of this episode was included in the special features, with Japanese audio only (the episode was available uncut with English audio for the US Renditions releases previously).

Cast

Voice Actors (Japan)
Takeshi Kusao: Shō Fukamachi/Guyver I
Yuko Mizutani: Mizuki Segawa
Kōzō Shioya: Tetsurō Segawa
Hideyuki Tanaka: Agito Makishima/Guyver III
Chieko Honda: Natsuki Taga
Jun Hazumi: Genzō Makishima/Enzyme
Kōji Totani: Gregole
Ken Yamaguchi: Vamore
Norio Wakamoto: Oswald A. Lisker/Guyver II
Kōichi Yamadera: Zerbebuth
Hidekatsu Shibata: Richard Guyot
Masashi Hironaka: Thancrus
Banjō Ginga: Gaster
Daisuke Gōri: Derzerb
Juurouta Kosugi: Elegen
Ikuya Sawaki: ZX-Tole
Hirotaka Suzuoki: Masaki Murakami
Yutaka Shimaka: Fumio Fukamachi
Seizō Katō: Dr. Hamilcar Barcas
Maria Kawamura: Shizu Onuma
Kenichi Ogata: Yōhei Onuma
Issei Futamata: Aptom

Voice Actors (English)
David Hart: Narrator (series I)/Genzo Makishima
Hal Cleaveland: Narrator (series II)
Tom Fahn: Shō Fukamachi/Guyver I, Malmont
Melissa Fahn: Mizuki Segawa
Víctor García: Tetsuro Segawa, Truck Driver
Steven Jay Blum: Agito Makishima/Guyver III, Zancrus
Gary Michaels: Oswald A. Lisker/Guyver II, Zector, Aptom
Bill Kestin: Rehalt Guou
Debra Rogers: Natsuki Taga/Mizusawa/Shizu
Steve Areno: Masaki Murakami
Sonny Byrkett: Dr. Balcus/Fumio Fukamachi
Mimi Woods: Newscaster
Susan Byrkett: Secretary
Dan Lorge: Zerebubus, Takasato, Darzerb, Mr. Onuma, Additional voices
Yutaka Maseba: Additional voices
Lee West: Additional voices
Bob Sessions: Genzo Makishima (Manga UK Version)
Stuart Milligan: Zector (Manga UK Version)

Theme songs
Opening Theme - "Bio Booster Armor Guyver" - Shinichi Ishihara (Episodes 1-12)
Ending Theme 1 - - Shinichi Ishihara (Episodes 1-6)
Ending Theme 2 -  - Katsumi Yamaura (Episodes 07-12)

Episode list
Part 1 (1989-1990)
Data 1: Genesis of the Guyver (September 25, 1989)
Data 2: Battle of the Guyver (October 25, 1989)
Data 3: Mysterious Shadow (November 25, 1989)
Data 4: Attack of the Hyper Zoanoid - Team 5 (December 16, 1989)
Data 5: Death of the Guyver (January 25, 1990)
Data 6: Terminal Battle - The Fall of Chronos Japan (February 25, 1990)

Part 2 (1992)
Data 7: The Battle Begins (February 20, 1992)
Data 8: The Last Unit (February 20, 1992)
Data 9: Transformation Tragedy (May 21, 1992)
Data 10: Haunted Village (May 21, 1992)
Data 11: The Beastmaster (August 21, 1992)
Data 12: Reactivation (August 21, 1992)

References

External links

Action anime and manga
1989 anime OVAs
1990 anime OVAs
1992 anime OVAs
Guyver (franchise)
Science fiction anime and manga

es:Guyver
ru:The Guyver: Bio-Booster Armour